Fuente del Berro is an administrative neighborhood (barrio) of Madrid belonging to the district of Salamanca. As of 1 March 2020, it has a population of 21,341. The park of the Quinta de la Fuente del Berro (after which the neighborhood is named) and El Pirulí are located in the neighborhood.

References 

Wards of Madrid
Salamanca (Madrid)